The South Fayette Township School District is a suburban, public school district serving the Pittsburgh suburb of South Fayette Township, Pennsylvania. In 2010, the district's population was 14,416 people. In 2009, the district residents’ per capita income was $26,082, while the median family income was $65,473. In the Commonwealth, the median family income was $49,501  and the United States median family income was $49,445, in 2010.

South Fayette Township School District operates four schools: South Fayette High School (9th-12th), South Fayette Middle School (6th-8th), South Fayette Intermediate School (3rd-5th) and South Fayette Elementary School (K-2nd). The Intermediate School was put into use in time for the 2013–2014 school year.

Extracurricular activities

The District offers a variety of clubs, activities and an extensive sports program.

Band
South Fayette High School has been home to the “Little Green Machine” Marching Band for over 60 years. Content is created entirely by the band's members; the graduating class assumes responsibility of choreography while the director arranges the music. Much of what the band practices today has been passed down through generations of South Fayette students and directors, including its three-part audition process and “rookie” spot rotation. Another key element of the Little Green Machine tradition requires all majorettes to successfully complete one full year as an instrumentalist in the band before auditioning to become a majorette. In addition to numerous performances at Pittsburgh Steelers games, the band has performed in the New York City St. Patrick's Day Parade, the Walt Disney World “Magic Music Days” Parade and many other high visibility venues across the East Coast. In 1994, the band was profiled in a Fox Sports Profile. In 2010, it was awarded the County Executive's Award and deemed the best marching band in the county.

Clubs
Clubs/activities in the middle school include the student-run newspaper, Student Council, National Junior Art Honor Society, the Spring Musical, Lion Hearts Club, Yearbook Staff, Media Club, Green Team, Drama Club, 5th/6th and 7th/8th grade chorus, 5th grade and 6th grade (separate) band and 7th/8th grade band, 7th/8th grade Jazz Ensemble, Spanish, German, and French Club, Friends of Rachel Club, MathCounts, and TSA.

Club/activities in the high school include French Club, German Club, Spanish Club, Health Careers Club, Library Club, Teen Institute, Circle of Friends, Art Club, National Honor Society, Technology Student Association, SADD (Students Against Destructive Decisions), Student Government, Prom Committee, Science Club, Homecoming Committee, Ski Club, Student Newspaper, Powder Puff Team, Yearbook Staff, Forensic Science Club, Media Team, FBLA (Future Business Leaders of America), Band (concert, jazz, & marching), Chorus (concert & show choir), Drama Club, Spring Musical, Fall Drama Production, Stage Crew, Quiz Bowl Team, and Model United Nations.

Athletics 
The following sports are offered to students in grades 9-12:
Fall Season: Varsity and Junior Varsity Football,
Varsity and Junior Varsity Cross-country
Boys Varsity and Junior Varsity Soccer
Girls Varsity and Junior Varsity Soccer
Varsity Golf
Girls Varsity and Junior Varsity Volleyball
Girls Varsity and Junior Varsity Tennis
8Varsity and Junior Varsity Cheerleading
Winter Season: Boys Varsity and Junior Varsity Basketball
Girls Varsity and Junior Varsity Basketball
Boys/Girls Varsity Swimming
Varsity and Junior Varsity Wrestling
Varsity and Junior Varsity Cheerleading
Hockey
Track (indoor)
Spring Season: Boys Varsity and Junior Varsity Baseball
Girls Varsity & Junior Varsity Softball
Boys Tennis
Varsity and Junior Varsity Track
Boys Lacrosse, Girls Lacrosse

In February 2010, the Boys Basketball Team won the PIAA State Championship in State College, Pennsylvania.

In November 2010, 2013, and 2014 the Football team won the WPIAL championship

In December 2013 and 2014, the Football team won the PIAA State Championship in Hershey, Pennsylvania, for the third and Fourth in the history of the school.

Controversies
In April 2014, it was reported that Christian Stanfield, a sophomore at South Fayette High, was brought up on charges of disorderly conduct after he recorded several people bullying him. When he reported it to school officials, they forced him to delete the video and called police to report that Stanfield may have violated the state's wiretapping law; Pennsylvania law requires all parties to consent to being recorded. The police opted to charge him with disorderly conduct, a charge that was upheld by a judge. However, the charges were later dropped by the Allegheny County District. Attorney

Former wrestling head coach Michael Ladick was fired in 2011 after 3 season as coach due to increasing demand from parents.

In 2017, former South Fayette High School assistant football coach Patrick Onesko was found guilty after soliciting two students of South Fayette through Snapchat. Patrick had been working at California University of Pennsylvania when the messaging began. Patrick told the boys that he was a 15-year-old girl from Bethel Park. He used the screen name ALAINABP5. The messages between the boys and Patrick included Patrick asking about the boys genitals and the boys calling Patrick a pedophile. The jurors found that Mr. Onesko was guilty of all counts against him: solicitation, unlawful contact with a minor and two counts of corruption of minors.

In May 2019, a 15-year-old student was suspended from South Fayette High School for retaliating against a white classmate who repeatedly called him a racial slur at lunch. 

In March 2021, teacher Donald Sekelik was suspended after his 10th-grade World Cultures class was told to imagine themselves as retired captains in the British navy and asked, “Is the slave trade profitable?”. According to the assignment, students needed to determine if, economically, they would profit more with a large "pack" of Africans who had lower odds of surviving the trip to America, or a smaller one with a better chance at survival.

Notable alumni
Jenna Morasca, model

References

School districts in Allegheny County, Pennsylvania
Education in Pittsburgh area